The Pennsylvania Department of Human Services is a cabinet-level state agency in Pennsylvania. The Pennsylvania Department of Human Services' seven program offices administer services that provide care and support to Pennsylvania's most vulnerable citizens. These services include eligibility and benefits determination, foster care, juvenile justice, early childhood development, services for persons with developmental disabilities, autism services, long-term living programs, management of state psychiatric hospitals, and management of the Medical Assistance physical and behavioral health care programs. The Department consists of executive offices and seven program offices that include:

 Office of Child Development and Early Learning
 Office of Children, Youth and Families
 Office of Developmental Programs
 Office of Income Maintenance
 Office of Long-Term Living
 Office of Medical Assistance Programs
 Office of Mental Health and Substance Abuse Services

Juvenile corrections
The Department of Human Services' (DHS) Bureau of Juvenile Justice Services (BJJS) is responsible for the administration, management, and oversight of Pennsylvania’s public facilities for adjudicated delinquent youth. These facilities, called "youth development centers," serve as prisons for juveniles.

Directly operated:
 Loysville Youth Development Center (LYDC) - Tyrone Township, Perry County - It has space for 54 students. The Loysville Secure Treatment Unit (LSTU) has 20 beds in a double-fenced area and has a strict security regimen.
 North Central Secure Treatment Unit (NCSTU) - On the grounds of Danville State Hospital -  This facility serves delinquent boys and delinquent girls. - It has a capacity for 112 students.
 South Mountain Secure Treatment Unit (South Mountain) - It is on the property of the South Mountain Restoration Center and has space for 36 students.

Forestry camps:
 Youth Forestry Camp #2 - Hickory Run State Park - It has a capacity for 49 students.
 Youth Forestry Camp #3 - Trough Creek State Park - It has a capacity for 50 students.

Former facilities:
 New Castle Youth Development Center (NCYDC) - Shenango Township, Lawrence County - The facility, which opened in 1969, had  of space in 13 buildings, and almost  of land. It closed in February 2013.
 Cresson Secure Treatment Unit (CSTU) - Operated by Justice Resource Institute (JRI) This facility was closed in 2015.

As of October 3, 1995, there were six secure juvenile facilities with 879 prisoners; the youth prisons were at 118% of their carrying capacity, and at the time it was the highest in the history of the juvenile corrections system. The juvenile system's 43 girls were located at New Castle YDC.

See also

 List of Pennsylvania state agencies

References

External links
Pennsylvania Department of Human Services

State agencies of Pennsylvania
State corrections departments of the United States
Social affairs ministries
Juvenile detention centers in the United States